Marine Security Belt, also known with the portmanteau CHIRU, is a trilateral naval exercise involving China, Iran and Russia as partners. First held in 2019, it is set to be taken place annually.

History

2019–20
The first edition of the exercise began on 27 December 2019 and took four days. The area of operation was the northern part of the Indian Ocean.

The units participating in the exercise included:

  Iran
 Alborz (frigate)
 Sahand (frigate)
 Bayandor (corvette)
 Tondar (hovercraft)
 Shahid Naserinejad (auxiliary ship)
 Shahid Nazeri (HARTH)

  China
 Xining (destroyer)
  Russia
 Yaroslav Mudry (frigate)
 Elnya (tanker)
 Viktor Konetsky (tugboat)

2021 
China was absent in the second version of the exercise when it was started by Russia and Iran on 16 February 2021. It was later announced that the Indian and Chinese navies will also join, but neither eventually take part. On 18 February 2021, the official website of the Indian Navy issued a statement denying participation in the drill. Turkish state-run Anadolu Agency reported that the Indian Navy had cancelled the plan at the last minute, because Tehran said China could join the exercise too and Indians did not want to be together with the Chinese due to recent border skirmishes.

The units participating in the exercise included:

  Iran
 Jamaran (frigate)
 Naghdi (corvette)
 Falakhon (fast attack craft)
 Shahid Nazeri (HARTH)

  Russia
 Stoikiy (corvette)
 Kola (replenishment ship)
 Yakov Grebelsky (tugboat)

2022 
The third version of the exercise was held in late January 2022 over an area of 17,000 square kilometres (6,560 square miles) in the northern Indian Ocean. It included a range of tactical exercises like putting out fires on burning vessels, releasing a hijacked vessel, and shooting at air targets at night.

The units participating in the exercise included:

  Iran
 Dena (frigate)
 Jamaran (frigate)
 Naghdi (corvette)
 Tabarzin (fast attack craft)
 Zereh (fast attack craft)
 Bahregan (auxiliary ship)
 Ganaveh (auxiliary ship)
 Shahid Nazeri (HARTH)

  China
 Ürümqi (destroyer)
  Russia
 Varyag (cruiser)
 Admiral Tributs (destroyer)
 Boris Butoma (replenishment ship)

References

Naval exercises
Military exercises involving Iran
Military exercises involving Russia
Military exercises involving China
Iran–Russia military relations
China–Iran military relations
China–Russia military relations